Shyorongi is a town and sector in the Rulindo district of Northern Province, Rwanda.

External links
Maplandia

Populated places in Rwanda